James V. Risser (born 1938) is an American journalist and Emeritus Professor of Communication at Stanford University.

Career

Risser worked for The Des Moines Register for 20 years after which he was a member of the Pulitzer Prize board. He was also the director for Knight Fellowships. He has won two Pulitzer Prizes for National Reporting, one in 1976 and the other in 1979. A Stanford University Prize was named after him, called the "Knight-Risser Prize for Western Environmental Journalism".

Awards 

 1979: Pulitzer Prize Winner in National Reporting "for a series on farming damage to the environment".
 1976: Pulitzer Prize Winner in National Reporting "for disclosing large-scale corruption in the American grain exporting trade".

References 

Living people
American male journalists
Pulitzer Prize for National Reporting winners
1938 births
Stanford University faculty